Genocide in Ukraine may refer to:

Holodomor, 1932–1933 man-made famine in Soviet Ukraine and its surroundings
Fântâna Albă massacre, Lunca massacre and Soviet deportations from Bessarabia and Northern Bukovina, acts of violence and genocide against Romanians in Soviet Ukraine
The Holocaust in Ukraine, aspect of the 1941–1944 genocide of European Jews by Nazi Germany
Massacres of Poles in Volhynia and Eastern Galicia
Deportation of the Crimean Tatars, 1944 ethnic cleansing and genocide in Soviet Union
Allegations of genocide of Ukrainians in the 2022 Russian invasion of Ukraine

See also
Holodomor genocide question, concerning the historical debate over the nature of the Holodomor
List of massacres in Ukraine
Ukraine v. Russian Federation (2022), an International Court of Justice case